Netria viridescens is a moth of the  family Notodontidae. It is found from the Oriental Tropics to New Guinea.

The wingspan is 66–87 mm. Adults have green forewings with darker medial and basal bands. There is some variation in the green tone (which is usually paler in females) and the intensity of the banding.

The larvae only feed on young leaves of Bassia, Mimusops, Sideroxylon and Achras sapota. They live on the undersides of the leaves of their host-plant. They are dull green with an orange-red collar and a shiny-granular head.

Subspecies
Netria viridescens viridescens (Java, Bali, Sundaland to New Guinea)
Netria viridescens continentalis Schintlmeister, 2006 (north-western and north-eastern India, Nepal, Myanmar, southern China, Sri Lanka, Taiwan, Vietnam, Laos, Cambodia, Thailand)
Netria viridescens pallidabasis Schintlmeister, 2006 (Palawan)
Netria viridescens suffusca Schintlmeister, 2006 (China: Yunnan)

References

Moths described in 1855
Notodontidae